Expedition 41 was the 41st expedition to the International Space Station. It began on 10 September 2014 with the undocking of Soyuz TMA-12M, returning the crew of Expedition 40 to Earth.

The expedition ended with the undocking of Soyuz TMA-13M on November 10, 2014. The remainder of Expedition 41's crew joined Expedition 42.

Crew

Source ESA

References

External links

 NASA's Space Station Expeditions page

Expeditions to the International Space Station
2014 in spaceflight